KCTZ is a  class A Spanish-language radio station broadcasting a Christian radio format from San Lucas, California.

History
KCTZ began broadcasting on July 16, 2012.

References

External links
 

Mass media in Monterey County, California
2013 establishments in California
Radio stations established in 2013
CTZ (FM)